The Gidhaur Chieftaincy was a principality which controlled parts of South Bihar for much of the medieval period in India. The chieftaincy was named after the town of Gidhaur in Jamui district but its territory extended into the wider region.

Origins

The Gidhaur chieftaincy was founded by Bir Bikram Shah who was a Chandel Rajput. The family accounts detail that his family originally held a small chieftaincy in Mahoba in Bundelkhand but were driven out by various foreign incursions including the invasion of Mahmud of Ghazni. From here they arrived in the Rewa area where they established the estate of Bardi. Bir Bikram Shah, who was the younger brother of the chief of Bardi, left his home and arrived in South Bihar where he established his power in the region by defeating the chief, Nagoria in 1262. From here, he continued to expand the extent of his chiefdom.

The Gidhaur chiefs were part of a larger movement of Rajput immigrants into Bihar from the 13th century onwards which included the rulers of Kharagpur Raj and Deo Raj.

History

Mughal period
After Bir Bikram Shah's death in 1339, he was succeeded by various descendants however Raghunath Singh was the first of his descendants to receive much attention in sources from the time. The 16th-century historian, Abbas Sarwani noted that Raghunath Singh accepted the rule of Sher Shah Suri and assisted him in his war against Humayun. Such was Sher Shah's trust in him, that he was even deputed to escort Saif Khan. His son was Bariar Singh who ruled Gidhaur till 1572. After Bariar Singh came Raja Puran Mal who was a contemporary of the Mughal Emperor Akbar. In 1580, Puran Mal joined a rebellion against the imperial authority which was led by Masum Khan Kabuli. Abu Fazl detailed that Puran Mal rescued  Masum Khan and his soldiers from Munger where they were trapped by Mughal soldiers. Puran Mal's disloyalty to the Mughals seems to have been temporary however as later sources note that he served with the Mughal commander, Shahbaz Khan Kamboh in an expedition against the Afghans. His son, Hari Singh, was kept as a hostage for the Mughals to ensure his continued compliance with the imperial authority.
Puran Mal also engaged in multiple clashes with the neighbouring chief of Kharagpur Raj, Sangram Singh and the two Raja’s were known to have a deep enmity.
After Pural Mal's death, the chiefs of Gidhaur seemed to have maintained their loyalty to the Mughal authorities and supported them in various expeditions. In the war of succession between Dara Shikoh and  Shah Shuja in 1658, both princes appealed for the assistance of Raja Dal Singh of Gidhaur who ended up supporting the former.

British period
The British East India Company assumed control of the region in the 18th century. The Gidhaur chief, Raja Jai Mangal Singh assisted them during the suppression of Santhal rebellion and the Indian rebellion of 1857. For his services, he was granted the title of Maharaja and made an Knights Commander of the Order of the Star of India in 1865.

Notable rulers

Gidhaur was ruled by the following Rajas after its establishment:

 Bir Bikram Singh - founder of Gidhaur
 Raghunath Singh - ally of Sher Shah Suri
 Raja Puran Mal 
 Raja Bisambhar Singh
 Raja Dalar Singh
 Raja Srikrishna Singh 1717 
 Raja Praduman Singh (1717-1725)
 Raja Shyam Singh (1725- 1741)
 Raja Amar Singh (1741-1765)
 Raja Bharat Singh
 Raja Gopal Singh
 Raja Jaswant Singh
 Raja Nawab Singh
 Maharaja Bahadur Jai Mangal 
Singh
 Maharaja Bahadur Shiv Prasad Singh
 Maharaja Bahadur Ravneshwar Singh
 Maharaja Bahadur Chandramoleshwar Singh
 Maharaja Bahadur Chandrachud Singh
 Maharaja Bahadur Pratap Singh

See also
Zamindars of Bihar

References 

Dynasties of India
Rajput estates
Kingdoms of Bihar